Felidae is the biological family of all cats.

Felidae may also refer to:
Felidae (novel), a novel by Akif Pirinçci.
Felidae (film), a 1994 animated film based on the novel.